A tripeptidyl peptidase is a type of enzyme.

Types include:
 Tripeptidyl peptidase I
 Tripeptidyl peptidase II

See also
 Dipeptidyl peptidase

External links
 

Proteases